Two ships of the United States Navy have been assigned the name Bull, in honor of Lieutenant (junior grade) Richard Bull (1914–1942).

She was returned to the United States and struck in 1946.
 , a Buckley-class destroyer escort, launched in March 1943 and struck in 1966. She was sold to the Republic of China where she served as the ROCS Lu Shan (PF-36), until she was scrapped in 1995.

See also 
 , a  named for Ensign Richard S. Bull (1913–1942), which was launched in November 1943 and struck in 1968.

References

United States Navy ship names